Mebendazole (MBZ), sold under the brand name Vermox among others, is a medication used to treat a number of parasitic worm infestations. This includes ascariasis, pinworm infection, hookworm infections, guinea worm infections, hydatid disease, and giardia, among others. It is taken by mouth.

Mebendazole is usually well tolerated. Common side effects include headache, vomiting, and ringing in the ears. If used at large doses it may cause bone marrow suppression. It is unclear if it is safe in pregnancy. Mebendazole is a broad-spectrum antihelminthic agent of the benzimidazole type.

Mebendazole came into use in 1971, after it was developed by Janssen Pharmaceutica in Belgium. It is on the World Health Organization's List of Essential Medicines. Mebendazole is available as a generic medication.

Medical use
Mebendazole is a highly effective, broad-spectrum antihelmintic indicated for the treatment of nematode infestations, including roundworm, hookworm, whipworm, threadworm (pinworm), and the intestinal form of trichinosis prior to its spread into the tissues beyond the digestive tract. Other drugs are used to treat worm infections outside the digestive tract, as mebendazole is poorly absorbed into the bloodstream. Mebendazole is used alone in those with mild to moderate infestations. It kills parasites relatively slowly, and in those with very heavy infestations, it can cause some parasites to migrate out of the digestive system, leading to appendicitis, bile duct problems, or intestinal perforation. To avoid this, heavily infested patients may be treated with piperazine, either before or instead of mebendazole. Piperazine paralyses the parasites, causing them to pass in the feces. It is also used rarely in the treatment of cystic echinococcosis, also known as hydatid disease. Evidence for effectiveness for this disease, however, is poor.

Mebendazole and other benzimidazole antithelmetics are active against both larval and adult stages of nematodes, and in the cases of roundworm and whipworm, kill the eggs, as well. Paralysis and death of the parasites occurs slowly, and elimination in the feces may require several days.

Special populations
Mebendazole has been shown to cause ill effects in pregnancy in animal models, and no adequate studies of its effects in human pregnancy have been conducted. Whether it can be passed by breastfeeding is unknown.

Adverse effects
Mebendazole sometimes causes diarrhea, abdominal pain, and elevated liver enzymes. In rare cases, it has been associated with a dangerously low white blood cell count, low platelet count, and hair loss, with a risk of agranulocytosis in rare cases.

Drug interactions
Carbamazepine and phenytoin lower serum levels of mebendazole. Cimetidine does not appreciably raise serum mebendazole (in contrast to the similar drug albendazole), consistent with its poor systemic absorption.

Stevens–Johnson syndrome and the more severe toxic epidermal necrolysis can occur when mebendazole is combined with high doses of metronidazole.

Mechanism
Mebendazole works by selectively inhibiting the synthesis of microtubules via binding to the colchicine binding site of β-tubulin, thereby blocking polymerisation of tubulin dimers in intestinal cells of parasites. Disruption of cytoplasmic microtubules leads to blocking the uptake of glucose and other nutrients, resulting in the gradual immobilization and eventual death of the helminths.

Poor absorption in the digestive tract makes mebendazole an efficient drug for treating intestinal parasitic infections with limited adverse effects. However mebendazole has an impact on mammalian cells, mostly by inhibiting polymeration of tubulin dimers, thereby disrupting essential microtubule structures such as mitotic spindle. Disassembly of the mitotic spindle then leads to apoptosis mediated via dephosphorylation of Bcl-2 which allows pro-apoptotic protein Bax to dimerize and initiate programmed cell death.

Society and culture

Availability 
Mebendazole is available as a generic medication. Mebendazole is distributed in international markets by Johnson and Johnson and a number of generic manufacturers.

Economics 

In the United States, mebendazole is sold at a couple hundred times the price of the same molecule in other countries.

Research
Several studies show mebendazole exhibits potent antitumor properties. mebendazole significantly inhibited cancer cell growth, migration, and metastatic formation of adrenocortical carcinoma, both in vitro and in vivo. Treatment of lung cancer cell lines with mebendazole caused mitotic arrest, followed by apoptotic cell death with the feature of caspase activation and cytochrome c release. Mebendazole induced a dose- and time-dependent apoptotic response in human lung cancer cell lines, and apoptosis via Bcl-2 inactivation in chemoresistant melanoma cells.
The anti-cancer effect of mebendazole comes from preclinical studies and case reports.

References

External links 
 

Anthelmintics
Aromatic ketones
Belgian inventions
Benzimidazoles
Carbamates
Embryotoxicants
Johnson & Johnson brands
Janssen Pharmaceutica
Wikipedia medicine articles ready to translate
Teratogens
World Health Organization essential medicines
Methyl esters